Autoroute 520 or the Côte-de-Liesse Expressway is an expressway that connects Montreal's Pierre Elliott Trudeau International Airport with Autoroute 20 at the expressway's western terminus and Autoroute 40 at the expressway's eastern terminus. This route serves as a link to the airport to residents living in the east of Montreal and the West Island as well as the city of Dorval.

Exit list

References

External links

A-520 at motorways-exits.com
A-520 at Quebec Autoroutes
Steve Anderson's MontrealRoads.com: Cote de Liesse Autoroute (A-520)
 Transports Quebec Road Map Network 

20-5
Roads in Montreal
Transport in Dorval
1966 establishments in Quebec